Scirpophaga gotoi is a moth in the family Crambidae. It was described by Angoon Lewvanich in 1981. It is found in the Chinese provinces of Jiangsu and Guangdong and in Japan.

References

Moths described in 1981
Schoenobiinae
Moths of Asia
Moths of Japan